The final and the qualifying heats of the men's 4×100 metre medley relay event at the 1998 World Aquatics Championships were held on Sunday 18 January 1998 in Perth, Western Australia.

Results

Heats

Final

See also
Swimming at the 1996 Summer Olympics – Men's 4 × 100 metre medley relay (Atlanta)
1997 FINA Short Course World Championships – Men's 4x100m Medley Relay (Gothenburg)
Swimming at the 1997 European Aquatics Championships – Men's 4 x 100 metre medley relay (Seville)
Swimming at the 2000 Summer Olympics – Men's 4 × 100 metre medley relay (Sydney)

References

Swimming at the 1998 World Aquatics Championships